Virus classification is the process of naming viruses and placing them into a taxonomic system similar to the classification systems used for cellular organisms.

Viruses are classified by phenotypic characteristics, such as morphology, nucleic acid type, mode of replication, host organisms, and the type of disease they cause. The formal taxonomic classification of viruses is the responsibility of the International Committee on Taxonomy of Viruses (ICTV) system, although the Baltimore classification system can be used to place viruses into one of seven groups based on their manner of mRNA synthesis. Specific naming conventions and further classification guidelines are set out by the ICTV.

A catalogue of all the world's known viruses has been proposed and, in 2013, some preliminary efforts were underway.

Definitions

Species definition 
Species form the basis for any biological classification system. Before 1982, it was thought that viruses could not be made to fit Ernst Mayr's reproductive concept of species, and so were not amenable to such treatment. In 1982, the ICTV started to define a species as "a cluster of strains" with unique identifying qualities. In 1991, the more specific principle that a virus species is a polythetic class of viruses that constitutes a replicating lineage and occupies a particular ecological niche was adopted.

In July 2013, the ICTV definition of species changed to state: "A species is a monophyletic group of viruses whose properties can be distinguished from those of other species by multiple criteria." These criteria include the structure of the capsid, the existence of an envelope, the gene expression program for its proteins, host range, pathogenicity, and most importantly genetic sequence similarity and phylogenetic relationship.

The actual criteria used vary by the taxon, and can be inconsistent (arbitrary similarity thresholds) or unrelated to lineage (geography) at times. The matter is, for many, not yet settled.

Virus definition 
The currently accepted and formal definition of a 'virus' was accepted by the ICTV Executive Committee in November 2020 and ratified in March 2021, and is as follows:

ICTV classification

The International Committee on Taxonomy of Viruses began to devise and implement rules for the naming and classification of viruses early in the 1970s, an effort that continues to the present. The ICTV is the only body charged by the International Union of Microbiological Societies with the task of developing, refining, and maintaining a universal virus taxonomy. The system shares many features with the classification system of cellular organisms, such as taxon structure. However, some differences exist, such as the universal use of italics for all taxonomic names, unlike in the International Code of Nomenclature for algae, fungi, and plants and International Code of Zoological Nomenclature.

Viral classification starts at the level of realm and continues as follows, with the taxonomic suffixes in parentheses:

Realm (-viria)
Subrealm (-vira)
Kingdom (-virae)
Subkingdom (-virites)
Phylum (-viricota)
Subphylum (-viricotina)
Class (-viricetes)
Subclass (-viricetidae)
Order (-virales)
Suborder (-virineae)
Family (-viridae)
Subfamily (-virinae)
Genus (-virus)
Subgenus (-virus)
Species

Unlike the system of binomial nomenclature adopted in cellular species, there is currently no standardized form for virus species names. At present, the ICTV mandates that a species name must contain as few words as possible while remaining distinct, and must not only contain the word virus and the host name. Species names often take the form of [Disease] virus, particularly for higher plants and animals. In 2019, the ICTV published a proposal to adopt a more formalized system of binomial nomenclature for virus species names, to be voted on in 2020. However, some virologists later objected to the potential naming system change, arguing that the debate came while many in the field were preoccupied due to the COVID-19 pandemic.

As of 2021, all levels of taxa except subrealm, subkingdom, and subclass are used. Six realms, one incertae sedis class, 19 incertae sedis families, and two incertae sedis genera are recognized:

Realms: Duplodnaviria, Monodnaviria, Adnaviria, Ribozyviria, Riboviria, and Varidnaviria

Incertae sedis families and classes:

 Alphasatellitidae
 Ampullaviridae
 Anelloviridae
 Avsunviroidae
 Bicaudaviridae
 Clavaviridae
 Finnlakeviridae
 Fuselloviridae
 Globuloviridae
 Guttaviridae
 Halspiviridae
 Naldaviricetes
 Ovaliviridae
 Plasmaviridae
 Polydnaviriformidae
 Portogloboviridae
 Pospiviroidae
 Spiraviridae
 Thaspiviridae
 Tolecusatellitidae

Incertae sedis genera: Dinodnavirus, Rhizidiovirus

Structure-based virus classification

It has been suggested that similarity in virion assembly and structure observed for certain viral groups infecting hosts from different domains of life (e.g., bacterial tectiviruses and eukaryotic adenoviruses or prokaryotic Caudovirales and eukaryotic herpesviruses) reflects an evolutionary relationship between these viruses. Therefore, structural relationship between viruses has been suggested to be used as a basis for defining higher-level taxa – structure-based viral lineages – that could complement the ICTV classification scheme of 2010.

The ICTV has gradually added many higher-level taxa using relationships in protein folds. All four realms defined in the 2019 release are defined by the presence of a protein of a certain structural family.

Baltimore classification

Baltimore classification (first defined in 1971) is a classification system that places viruses into one of seven groups depending on a combination of their nucleic acid (DNA or RNA), strandedness (single-stranded or double-stranded), sense, and method of replication. Named after David Baltimore, a Nobel Prize-winning biologist, these groups are designated by Roman numerals. Other classifications are determined by the disease caused by the virus or its morphology, neither of which are satisfactory due to different viruses either causing the same disease or looking very similar. In addition, viral structures are often difficult to determine under the microscope. Classifying viruses according to their genome means that those in a given category will all behave in a similar fashion, offering some indication of how to proceed with further research. Viruses can be placed in one of the seven following groups:

DNA viruses

Viruses with a DNA genome, except for the DNA reverse transcribing viruses, are members of three of the four recognized viral realms: Duplodnaviria, Monodnaviria, and Varidnaviria. But the incertae sedis order Ligamenvirales, and many other incertae sedis families and genera, are also used to classify DNA viruses. The domains Duplodnaviria and Varidnaviria consist of double-stranded DNA viruses; other double-stranded DNA viruses are incertae sedis. The domain Monodnaviria consists of single-stranded DNA viruses that generally encode a HUH endonuclease; other single-stranded DNA viruses are incertae sedis.
 Group I: viruses possess double-stranded DNA. Viruses that cause chickenpox and herpes are found here.
 Group II: viruses possess single-stranded DNA.

RNA viruses

All viruses that have an RNA genome, and that encode an RNA-dependent RNA polymerase (RdRp), are members of the kingdom Orthornavirae, within the realm Riboviria.
 Group III: viruses possess double-stranded RNA genomes, e.g. rotavirus.
 Group IV: viruses possess positive-sense single-stranded RNA genomes. Many well known viruses are found in this group, including the picornaviruses (which is a family of viruses that includes well-known viruses like Hepatitis A virus, enteroviruses, rhinoviruses, poliovirus, and foot-and-mouth virus), SARS virus, hepatitis C virus, yellow fever virus, and rubella virus.
 Group V: viruses possess negative-sense single-stranded RNA genomes. Ebola and Marburg viruses are well known members of this group, along with influenza virus, measles, mumps and rabies.

Reverse transcribing viruses
All viruses that encode a reverse transcriptase (also known as RT or RNA-dependent DNA polymerase) are members of the class Revtraviricetes, within the phylum Arterviricota, kingdom Pararnavirae, and realm Riboviria. The class Blubervirales contains the single family Hepadnaviridae of DNA RT (reverse transcribing) viruses; all other RT viruses are members of the class Ortervirales.
 Group VI: viruses possess single-stranded RNA viruses that replicate through a DNA intermediate. The retroviruses are included in this group, of which HIV is a member.
 Group VII: viruses possess double-stranded DNA genomes and replicate using reverse transcriptase. The hepatitis B virus can be found in this group.

Historical systems

Holmes classification 
Holmes (1948) used a Linnaean taxonomy with binomial nomenclature to classify viruses into 3 groups under one order, Virales. They are placed as follows:
 Group I: Phaginae (attacks bacteria)
 Group II: Phytophaginae (attacks plants)
 Group III: Zoophaginae (attacks animals)

The system was not accepted by others due to its neglect of morphological similarities.

Subviral agents

The following infectious agents are smaller than viruses and have only some of their properties. Since 2015, the ICTV has allowed them to be classified in a similar way as viruses are.

Viroids and virus-dependent agents

Viroids

 Family Avsunviroidae
 Genus Avsunviroid; type species: Avocado sunblotch viroid
 Genus Pelamoviroid; type species: Peach latent mosaic viroid
 Genus Elaviroid; type species: Eggplant latent viroid
 Family Pospiviroidae
 Genus Pospiviroid; type species: Potato spindle tuber viroid
 Genus Hostuviroid; type species: Hop stunt viroid
 Genus Cocadviroid; type species: Coconut cadang-cadang viroid
 Genus Apscaviroid; type species: Apple scar skin viroid
 Genus Coleviroid; type species: Coleus blumei viroid 1

Satellites

Satellites depend on co-infection of a host cell with a helper virus for productive multiplication. Their nucleic acids have substantially distinct nucleotide sequences from either their helper virus or host. When a satellite subviral agent encodes the coat protein in which it is encapsulated, it is then called a satellite virus.

Satellite-like nucleic acids resemble satellite nucleic acids, in that they replicate with the aid of helper viruses. However they differ in that they can encode functions that can contribute to the success of their helper viruses; while they are sometimes considered to be genomic elements of their helper viruses, they are not always found within their helper viruses.
 Satellite viruses
 Single-stranded RNA satellite viruses
 (unnamed family)
 Aumaivirus – Maize white line mosaic satellite virus
 Papanivirus – Panicum mosaic satellite virus
 Virtovirus – Tobacco mosaic satellite virus
 Albetovirus – Tobacco necrosis satellite virus
 Family Sarthroviridae
 Macronovirus – Macrobrachium satellite virus 1 (extra small virus)
 (unnamed genus) – Nilaparvata lugens commensal X virus
 (unnamed genus) – Chronic bee-paralysis satellite virus
 Double-stranded DNA satellite viruses
 Family Lavidaviridae – Virophages
 Single-stranded DNA satellite viruses
 Genus Dependoparvovirus – Adeno-associated virus group
 Satellite nucleic acids
 Single-stranded satellite DNAs
 Family Alphasatellitidae (encoding a replication initiator protein)
 Family Tolecusatellitidae (encoding a pathogenicity determinant βC1)
 Double-stranded satellite RNAs
 Single-stranded satellite RNAs
 Subgroup 1: Large satellite RNAs
 Subgroup 2: Small linear satellite RNAs
 Subgroup 3: Circular satellite RNAs (virusoids)
 Genus Deltavirus
 Polerovirus-associated RNAs
 Satellite-like RNA
 Satellite-like DNA

Defective interfering particles

Defective interfering particles are defective viruses that have lost their ability to replicate except in the presence of a helper virus, which is normally the parental virus. They can also interfere with the helper virus.
 Defective interfering particles (RNA)
 Defective interfering particles (DNA)

See also

Notes

External links 

 ICTV web site 
 ICTV International Committee on Taxonomy of Viruses Master Species List 2009 Version 10 (This is version was published on August 24, 2011)
 The Baltimore Method
 Virus Pathogen Database and Analysis Resource (ViPR)
 How are Viruses Classified?

classification
Biological classification